Primary inoculation tuberculosis  is a skin condition that develops at the site of inoculation of tubercle bacilli into a tuberculosis-free individual.

See also 
 Tuberculosis verrucosa cutis
 Skin lesion
 List of cutaneous conditions

References 

Mycobacterium-related cutaneous conditions